Hard may refer to:
 Hardness, resistance of physical materials to deformation or fracture
 Hard water, water with high mineral content

Arts and entertainment 
 Hard (TV series), a French TV series
 Hard (band), a Hungarian hard rock supergroup 
 Hard (music festival), in the U.S.
 Hard (EP), Goodbye Mr Mackenzie, 1993
 Hard (Brainpower album), 2008
 Hard (Gang of Four album), 1983
 Hard (Jagged Edge album), 2003
 "Hard" (song), a 2009 song by Rihanna
 "Hard", a song by Royce da 5'9" from the 2016 album Layers
 "Hard", a song by Why Don't We from the 2018 album 8 Letters
 Hard, a 2017 EP from the band The Neighbourhood
"Hard", a song by Sophie from the 2015 compilation album Product

Places
 Hard, Austria
 Hard (Zürich), Switzerland

Other uses
 Hard (surname)
 Nickname of Masaki Sumitani ( HardGay / HardoGay )
 Hard (nautical), a beach or slope convenient for hauling out vessels
 hard, slang for an erection
 Hard (gamer), Anthony Barkhovtsev
 Hayward Area Recreation and Park District, California, U.S.
 Hard, consonants that are not palatalized

See also 

 Hardcourt or hard court, is a surface or floor on which a sport is played
 Computational hardness assumption